Catoptria radiella is a species of moth in the family Crambidae. It is found in France, Italy, Poland and Romania.

The length of the forewings is 12–13 mm.

Subspecies
Catoptria radiella radiella (Alps)
Catoptria radiella intermediellus (Müller-Rutz, 1920) (Basses Alpes, Alpes-Maritimes, Apennines)
Catoptria radiella tristrigellus (Ragonot, 1875) (Switzerland, Tatra Mountains)

References

Moths described in 1813
Crambini
Moths of Europe